A table or chart of nuclides is a two-dimensional graph of isotopes of the elements, in which one axis represents the number of neutrons (symbol N) and the other represents the number of protons (atomic number, symbol Z) in the atomic nucleus.  Each point plotted on the graph thus represents a nuclide of a known or hypothetical chemical element. This system of ordering nuclides can offer a greater insight into the characteristics of isotopes than the better-known periodic table, which shows only elements and not their isotopes.  The chart of the nuclides is also known as the Segrè chart, after the Italian physicist Emilio Segrè.

Description and utility

A chart or table of nuclides maps the nuclear, or radioactive, behavior of nuclides, as it distinguishes the isotopes of an element. It contrasts with a periodic table, which only maps their chemical behavior, since isotopes (nuclides which are variants of the same element) do not differ chemically to any significant degree, with the exception of hydrogen. Nuclide charts organize nuclides along the X axis by their numbers of neutrons and along the Y axis by their numbers of protons, out to the limits of the neutron and proton drip lines. This representation was first published by Kurt Guggenheimer in 1934 and expanded by Giorgio Fea in 1935, Emilio Segrè in 1945 or Glenn Seaborg. In 1958, Walter Seelmann-Eggebert and Gerda Pfennig published the first edition of the Karlsruhe Nuclide Chart. Its 7th edition was made available in 2006. Today, there are several nuclide charts, four of which have a wide distribution: the Karlsruhe Nuclide Chart, the Strasbourg Universal Nuclide Chart, the Chart of the Nuclides from the Japan Atomic Energy Agency (JAEA), and the Nuclide Chart from Knolls Atomic Power Laboratory in the United States. It has become a basic tool of the nuclear community.

Trends in the chart of nuclides

 Isotopes are nuclides with the same number of protons but differing numbers of neutrons; that is, they have the same atomic number and are therefore the same chemical element. Isotopes neighbor each other vertically. Examples include carbon-12, carbon-13, and carbon-14 in the table above.
 Isotones are nuclides with the same number of neutrons but differing numbers of protons. Isotones neighbor each other horizontally. Examples include carbon-14, nitrogen-15, and oxygen-16 in the table above.
 Isobars are nuclides with the same number of nucleons (i.e. mass number) but different numbers of protons and neutrons. Isobars neighbor each other diagonally from lower-left to upper-right. Examples include carbon-14, nitrogen-14, and oxygen-14 in the table above.
 Isodiaphers are nuclides with the same difference between their numbers of neutrons and protons (N − Z).  Like isobars, they follow diagonal lines, but at right angles to the isobar lines (from upper-left to lower-right).  Examples include boron-10, carbon-12, and nitrogen-14 (as N − Z = 0 for each pair), or boron-12, carbon-14, and nitrogen-16 (as N − Z = 2 for each pair).
 Beyond the neutron drip line along the lower left, nuclides decay by neutron emission.
 Beyond the proton drip line along the upper right, nuclides decay by proton emission. Drip lines have only been established for some elements. 
 The island of stability is a hypothetical region in the top right cluster of nuclides that contains isotopes far more stable than other transuranic elements.
 There are no stable nuclides having an equal number of protons and neutrons in their nuclei with atomic number greater than 20 (i.e. calcium) as can be readily observed from the chart. Nuclei of greater atomic number require an excess of neutrons for stability.
 The only stable nuclides having an odd number of protons and an odd number of neutrons are hydrogen-2, lithium-6, boron-10, nitrogen-14 and (observationally) tantalum-180m. This is because the mass-energy of such atoms is usually higher than that of their neighbors on the same isobaric chain, so most of them are unstable to beta decay.
 There are no stable nuclides with mass numbers 5 or 8. There are stable nuclides with all other mass numbers up to 208 with the exceptions of 147 and 151. (Bismuth-209 was found to be radioactive in 2003, but with a half-life of 1.9×1019 years.)
 With the exception of the pair tellurium-123 and antimony-123, odd mass numbers are never represented by more than one stable nuclide. This is because the mass-energy is a convex function of atomic number, so all nuclides on an odd isobaric chain except one have a lower-energy neighbor to which they can decay by beta decay. See Mattauch isobar rule. (123Te is expected to decay to 123Sb, but the half-life appears to be so long that the decay has never been observed.)
 There are no stable nuclides having atomic number greater than Z = 82 (lead), although bismuth (Z = 83) is stable for all practical human purposes. Elements with atomic numbers from 1 to 82 all have stable isotopes, with the exceptions of technetium (Z = 43) and promethium (Z = 61).

Tables 

For convenience, three different views of the data are available on Wikipedia: two sets of "segmented tables", and a single "unitized table (all elements)". The unitized table allows easy visualizion of proton/neutron-count trends but requires simultaneous horizontal and vertical scrolling. The segmented tables permit easier examination of a particular chemical element with much less scrolling. Links are provided to quickly jump between the different sections.

Segmented tables
 Table of nuclides (segmented, narrow)
 Table of nuclides (segmented, wide)

Full table

The nuclide table below shows nuclides (often loosely called "isotopes", but this term properly refers to nuclides with the same atomic number, see above), including all with half-life of at least one day. They are arranged with increasing atomic numbers from left to right and increasing neutron numbers from top to bottom.

Cell color denotes the half-life of each nuclide; if a border is present, its color indicates the half-life of the most stable nuclear isomer. In graphical browsers, each nuclide also has a tool tip indicating its half-life.
Each color represents a certain range of length of half-life, and the color of the border indicates the half-life of its nuclear isomer state. Some nuclides have multiple nuclear isomers, and this table notes the longest one.
Dotted borders mean that a nuclide has a nuclear isomer, and their color is represented the same way as for their normal counterparts.
The dashed lines between several nuclides of the first few elements are the experimentally determined proton and neutron drip lines.

References

External links

 Chart of the Nuclides 2014 (Japan Atomic Energy Agency)
  Interactive Chart of Nuclides (Brookhaven National Laboratory)
 Karlsruhe Nuclide Chart – New 10th edition 2018
 Nucleonica web driven nuclear science
 IAEA Live Chart of Nuclides
  app for mobiles:   Android   or   Apple   - for PC use The Live Chart of Nuclides - IAEA 
 The Colourful Nuclide Chart, by Dr Edward Simpson of Australian National University.
 Another example of a Chart of Nuclides from Korea Data up to Jan 1999 only

Tables of nuclides